National Forum may refer to:
 National Forum (Croatia), a citizen association and a political party (as of February 1, 2014) in Croatia
 National Forum (Georgia), a political party in Georgia in the Caucasus
 National Forum of Civil and Civic Awakening, a political party in Benin
 National Forum of Music, a music venue in Wrocław, Poland
 National Forum on Europe, Ireland, founded to inform the public in a non-partisan and neutral manner about developments in the European Union

See also
Forum (disambiguation)